Volkswagen Vento can refer to:
 Volkswagen Vento (A3) (1992–1999), the third generation Jetta was badged as the Volkswagen Vento outside of North America.
 Volkswagen Jetta (A5) (2005–2011), the fifth generation Jetta was rebadged as the Volkswagen Vento in Argentina, Chile and Uruguay.
 Volkswagen Jetta (A6) (2011–2018), the sixth generation Jetta was rebadged as the Volkswagen Vento in select South American countries.
 Volkswagen Jetta (A7) (2018–present), the seventh generation Jetta was rebadged as the Volkswagen Vento in select South American countries.
 Volkswagen Vento (A05) (2010–2022), a Polo-based sedan was badged as the Volkswagen Vento in India and Mexico.

Compact cars
Subcompact cars
Vento